Helen Bullock may refer to:
 Helen Bullock (politician) (born 1965), Chinese-born Australian politician
 Helen Bullock (historian) (1905–1995), American historian
 Helen Louise Bullock (1836–1927), musical educator, temperance reformer, women's prison reformer, suffragist, and philanthropist